James McDaniel Jr. (born March 25, 1958) is an American stage, film and television actor. He is best known for playing Lt. Arthur Fancy on the television show NYPD Blue. He created the role of Paul in the hit Lincoln Center play Six Degrees of Separation. He played a police officer in the ill-fated 1990 series Cop Rock, and a close advisor to the director Spike Lee regarding the activist Malcolm X in the 1992 film Malcolm X. He also played Sgt. Jesse Longford in the ABC television series Detroit 1-8-7.

Early life
He was born as James McDaniel Jr. in Washington, D.C. on March 25, 1958, the son of physician James McDaniel Sr. The junior McDaniel attended the University of Pennsylvania, where he studied veterinary medicine. After taking his final exams, he decided to move to New York and become an actor, despite having no prior acting experience. McDaniel enrolled in dance and voice lessons, and earned his first role in a Pepsi commercial.

Career
McDaniel began acting on the stage. He appeared in the original production of Six Degrees of Separation as Paul Poitier, and received the Clarence Derwent Award for his performance. McDaniel originated the role of Adam in Someone Who'll Watch Over Me, being the only American in the cast. He received an Obie Award after performing in Before It Hits Home.

Early roles on television include guest appearances on sitcom Kate & Allie and crime drama Gabriel's Fire. He portrayed police officer Franklin Rose on the short-lived and poorly received series Cop Rock. McDaniel had a minor role in the Woody Allen film Alice (1990), was a banker in Strictly Business (1991) and portrayed Brother Earl in Spike Lee's Malcolm X (1992).

McDaniel guest starred as a cop on Hill Street Blues, created by Steven Bochco. Thereafter, he appeared often in productions with Bochco's involvement, including L.A. Law and Civil Wars. He played Lt. Arthur Fancy on NYPD Blue for eight seasons, between 1993 to 2001. The series attracted some criticism regarding McDaniel being underutilized during his time on the show. McDaniel himself alluded to this, claiming to be "the highest paid extra on television." He was nominated for a Primetime Emmy Award for Outstanding Supporting Actor in a Drama Series in 1996 for his work on the series. He also received three consecutive NAACP Image Award nominations for Outstanding Supporting Actor in a Drama Series.

He portrayed the role of Sgt. Jesse Longford in crime drama Detroit 1-8-7. McDaniel appeared as an investigator in The Following and was Ezra Mills, Abbie's father, in Sleepy Hollow. McDaniel made a guest appearance as a jazz trumpeter in NCIS: New Orleans. McDaniel appeared in Tamara Tunie's See You in September (2010) and in the Jordana Spiro film Night Comes On (2018).

McDaniel has also appeared extensively in television films, namely Silencing Mary (1996), Unforgivable (1996), and Out of Time (2000), the latter in a rare role as the main character. He portrayed Nat King Cole in Livin' for Love: The Natalie Cole Story (2000). Natalie Cole personally handpicked McDaniel to play her father.

Personal life
With his wife Hannelore, McDaniel has two children.

Filmography

Film

Television

Accolades
McDaniel won a 1995 Screen Actors Guild Award for Outstanding Performance by an Ensemble in a Drama Series for NYPD Blue, and won the 2006 Daytime Emmy Award for Outstanding Performer in a Children/Youth/Family Special, "Edge of America". He has also been nominated for two Primetime Emmys for his work on NYPD Blue.

 Obie Award for Before It Hits Home, 1991–1992 season
 Drama Desk nomination for Before It Hits Home, 1991–1992 season
 Clarence Derwent Award
 Peabody Award for "Edge of America" (2005; NYPD Blue episode)

References

External links

 

1958 births
20th-century American male actors
21st-century American male actors
African-American male actors
American male film actors
American male stage actors
American male television actors
Living people
Male actors from Washington, D.C.
University of Pennsylvania alumni
20th-century African-American people
21st-century African-American people